Monchy-le-Preux is a hamlet in the commune of Campneuseville, in the Seine-Maritime department of France. It was a former commune of Normandy, and has been joined to Campneuseville in 1823.

Notes

Former communes of Seine-Maritime